SS8 may refer to:
 SS-8 Sasin, a Soviet intercontinental ballistic missile
 China Railways SS8, an electric locomotive
 , a submarine of the United States Navy